The Eugene Applebaum College of Pharmacy and Health Sciences was founded in 1924. Previously known as the College of Pharmacy and Allied Health Professions, the name changed to the Eugene Applebaum College of Pharmacy and Health Sciences in the year 2000. It is currently located in Midtown Detroit, Michigan and is one of Wayne State University's professional schools. There are currently 12 programs being offered at the school. The college is divided into four academic departments: Applied Health Sciences, Health Care Sciences, Pharmacy Practice, and Pharmaceutical Sciences.

Building
The current building opened in May 2002. The building is 270,000 square feet with five floors, six levels and was designed by Neumann/Smith Architecture. The building provides multiple laboratories, offices, and classrooms, divided by program. Mortuary science students work in their own building, located on Woodward Avenue in Detroit.

Student body
In fall 2019, the Eugene Applebaum College of Pharmacy and Health Sciences had 976 total students enrolled, with 926 full-time students and 50 part-time students. There were 203 total undergraduate students, 368 graduate students, and 405 professional students. There were 90 full-time faculty members. 

A total of 456 degrees were granted to students in the 2018-19 school year. These degrees that were granted included 209 baccalaureate degrees, 6 postbaccalaureate certificates, 102 master's degree,  and 139 doctoral degrees.

Rankings 
For 2021, U.S News & World Report ranked the Eugene Applebaum College of Pharmacy and Health Sciences in the top 20% in the nation for its nurse-anesthesia program,  and ranked its occupational therapy program in the top 35% of the nation. Its occupational therapy program is also in the top 35% of ranked schools, the pharmacy program is ranked 43 out of 134 ranked schools, and its physician assistant program is the top-ranked in Michigan (a tie with Western Michigan University), and ranked 108 out of 170 ranked schools nationwide.

References

Pharmacy schools in Michigan
Wayne State University
Educational institutions established in 1924
1924 establishments in Michigan